Explode Coração is a Brazilian telenovela produced by TV Globo. The series aired between 6 November 1995 and 4 May 1996, with a total of 155 episodes. It was written entirely by Glória Perez and directed by Ary Coslov, Gracie, and Carlos Araújo Júnior. Production had general direction and core Dennis Carvalho and was the 51st "Novela das Oito" (prime-time soap opera).

Edson Celulari, Tereza Seiblitz, and Ricardo Macchi play the leading roles in a plot centered around the love triangle formed by the protagonists which also addresses the gypsy culture in Brazil. Other main roles are played by Maria Luísa Mendonça, Leandra Leal, Rodrigo Santoro, Renée de Vielmond, Eliane Giardini, Paulo José, Françoise Forton, Cássio Gabus Mendes, Deborah Evelyn, Laura Cardoso, Stênio Garcia and Ester Góes.

Synopsis 

Dara (Tereza Seiblitz) is a young gypsy who takes pride in her cultural origins but refuses to be bound by tradition. She refuses to marry Igor (Ricardo Macchi), the groom who was chosen for her by her father Jairo (Paulo José) and mother Lola (Eliane Giardini). Her younger sister has feelings for Igor, but he only has eyes for Dara and fights for her love. Dara falls for an engaged businessman she meets online - Júlio Falcão (Edson Celulari). Julio is a man who loves money and seducing women. He lives a marriage of appearances with Vera (Maria Luísa Mendonça). Igor and Vera, as well as the traditions of the Roma people, are the greatest obstacles in the love story of Julio and Dara.

Cast 
Cast in alphabetical order
 André Luiz as Marcos Avelar Falcão
 Carla Tausz as Mirtes
 Cássia Linhares as Natasha
 Cássio Gabus Mendes as Edu / Vitor Salgado
 Cláudio Cavalcanti as José Rubens Tolentino
 Daniel Dantas as Tadeu
 Débora Duarte as Marisa Carvalho Diaz
 Deborah Evelyn as Yone Sampaio
 Edson Celulari as Júlio Cezar Falcão
 Eliane Giardini as Lola Sbano
 Elias Gleizer as Augusto Lemos
 Eri Johnson as Adilson Gaivota
 Ester Góes as Luzia Nicolich
 Felipe Folgosi as Vladimir
 Floriano Peixoto as Sarita Vitti
 Françoise Forton as Eugênia Avelar
 Gracindo Júnior as Geraldo
 Guilherme Karan as Bebeto a Jato
 Helena Ranaldi as Larissa
 Herson Capri as Ivan Méndez
 Isadora Ribeiro as Odaísa
 Ivan de Albuquerque as Mio Sbano
 Karina Perez as Laura
 Laura Cardoso as Soraya Nicolich
 Leandra Leal as Yanka Sbano
 Luís Cláudio Júnior as Gustavo "Gugu"
 Maria Luísa Mendonça as Vera Avelar Falcão
 Marianne Vicentini as Valéria
 Nívea Maria as Alícia Lemos
 Odilon Wagner as Leandro Avelar
 Patrick Alencar as Ricardo "Rique" Antônio Lemos
 Paula Burlamaqui as Roseneide "Rose"
 Paula Lavigne as Sônia Salgado / Soninha Contratempo
 Paulo José as  Jairo
 Regina Dourado as Lucineide Salgado
 Reginaldo Faria as César Lemos
 Renée de Vielmond as Elizabeth "Beth"
 Ricardo Macchi as Igor Nicolich
 Roberta Índio do Brasil as Maria Catarina Lemos "Catty"
 Rodrigo Santoro as Serginho
 Rogério Cardoso as Romualdo Salgado "Salgadinho"
 Sônia de Paula as Hebinha
 Stella Freitas as Pattia
 Stênio Garcia as Pepe Nicolich
 Tereza Seiblitz as Dara Sbano
 Zezé Polessa as Mila Tolentino

External links

1995 telenovelas
TV Globo telenovelas
Brazilian telenovelas
1995 Brazilian television series debuts
1996 Brazilian television series endings
Brazilian LGBT-related television shows
Fictional representations of Romani people
Telenovelas by Glória Perez
Portuguese-language telenovelas
Television shows set in Rio de Janeiro (city)